Lost Angel is a 1943 drama film directed by Roy Rowland, starring Margaret O'Brien as a little orphan girl raised to be a genius. James Craig plays a reporter who shows her the world outside the Institute of Child Psychology.

Plot
The professors of the Institute of Child Psychology raise a foundling baby, whom they name "Alpha", as an experiment to see if a scientific upbringing can create a genius. By the time she is six years old, Alpha can speak Chinese, play chess and the harp, and has studied algebra and the campaigns of Napoleon, among other things.

Newspaper reporter Mike Regan is assigned, over his protests, to write an article about her. He manages to secure an interview, despite the reluctance of the professors, and discovers that Alpha, while raised with loving care, has missed out on the joys of childhood. Disturbed by Mike's claim that magic is real, Alpha decides to investigate further and sneaks out to see Mike, leaving the confines of the institute for the first time in her life.

She enjoys the sights and sounds of New York as she makes her way to the offices of the newspaper. Mike is less than pleased to see her, but takes her along so he can keep a date with his girlfriend, nightclub singer Katie Mallory (Marsha Hunt). Alpha takes an instant dislike to Katie; it turns out that the child has a crush on Mike. However, Katie's kindness and understanding soon win Alpha over.

An outbreak of measles at the Institute and the resulting quarantine force Mike to look after Alpha for a few days. That night, escaped convicted murderer Packy Roost (Keenan Wynn) shows up at Mike's apartment. While waiting for the reporter, he and Alpha become friends. When Mike does come back, Packy demands he find Lefty Moran, who can clear him of the crime. The reporter reluctantly agrees, eventually bringing in Lefty. It turns out that Lefty is the killer; the police take him away, and Packy is exonerated.

When the professors come to reclaim their test subject, she does not want to leave Mike. However, he is unwilling to accept the responsibility and does not put up a fight for her. When Mike proposes marriage to Katie, she turns him down, citing his irresponsibility. Guilt-ridden, he gets a job transfer to Washington, DC. Meanwhile, a despondent Alpha refuses to eat or sleep. Mike has a change of heart and is reunited with both Alpha and Katie. The three leave the institute hand in hand.

Cast

Margaret O'Brien as Alpha
James Craig as Mike Regan
Marsha Hunt as Katie Mallory
Philip Merivale as Professor Peter Vincent
Henry O'Neill as Professor Josh Pringle
Donald Meek as Professor Catty
Keenan Wynn as Packy Roost
Alan Napier as Dr. Woodring
Sara Haden as Rhoda Kitterick
Kathleen Lockhart as Mrs. Catty
Walter Fenner as Professor Endicott
Howard Freeman as Professor Richards
Elisabeth Risdon as Mrs. Pringle
Robert Blake as Jerry (as Bobby Blake), a young boy Alpha befriends
Ava Gardner Uncredited as a Hat Check Girl
Ray Walker as Trainer

Adaptations
Lost Angel was adapted as a radio play on the June 19, 1944 and October 22, 1945 broadcasts of Lux Radio Theater and the December 18, 1946 broadcast of Academy Award Theater, each starring Margaret O'Brien.

External links
 
 
 

1943 films
1943 drama films
American black-and-white films
American drama films
Films about orphans
Films directed by Roy Rowland
Films scored by Daniele Amfitheatrof
Films set in New York City
Metro-Goldwyn-Mayer films
1940s English-language films
1940s American films